Justin Mott (born 1978) is an American photographer living in Vietnam.  Mott specializes in wildlife photojournalism and conservation photography and is currently working on a long-term, self-funded project, Kindred Guardians, documenting people all over the world who dedicate their lives to helping animals.  He was the resident professional photographer on Photo Face-Off, a reality TV show on History Channel for 5 seasons in which Mott competes against and judges amateur photographers throughout Southeast Asia.

Early life and education 
Mott was born in Rhode Island in 1978. He moved to San Francisco in 1999 and studied photojournalism at San Francisco State University from 2002 to 2006.  He was selected to the Eddie Adams Workshop in 2007. In 2007 he moved to Vietnam full-time.

Career 
Mott was heavily influenced by Magnum photographer Philip Jones Griffiths' book Agent Orange: Collateral Damage in Viet Nam. In 2005 Mott traveled to Vietnam to work on his own documentary project about Agent Orange victims. His project, titled "Legacy of Horror", was later published in Newsweek, awarded the Marty Forscher Fellowship for humanistic photography by the Parsons School of Design in New York, and published in the PDN Annual Photography Awards Issue.

In 2007 Mott moved to Hanoi to work as a photojournalist. He has been working as a contributing photographer for The New York Times in Southeast Asia since 2007. Mott has photographed over 100 diverse assignments for the Times covering a wide spectrum of topics throughout the region.

In 2009, Mott founded Mott Visuals, a commercial photography and video production business.

In 2013 Mott's work "Changing Face of Vietnam" was featured on the BBC.

Mott is currently working on a long term personal project titled "Kindred Guardians" dedicated to photographing the stories of people around the world who dedicate their lives to animal welfare and animal conservation.

 Awards
 2019: IPA International Photography Awards. Kindred Guardians series documenting the plight of the last two remaining northern white rhinos. 

 2008: Marty Forscher Fellowship for humanistic photography by the Parson's School of Design in New York. PDN Annual, NPPA, CPOY, and the Missouri School of Journalism.
2013: One Shot – Extraordinary category of Travel Photographer of the Year, international.

Television

References

External links

Photographers from California
1978 births
Living people